UFC 212: Aldo vs. Holloway was a mixed martial arts event produced by the Ultimate Fighting Championship held on June 3, 2017, at the Jeunesse Arena in Rio de Janeiro, Brazil.

Background
A UFC Featherweight Championship unification bout between two-time champion José Aldo and interim champion Max Holloway served as the main event.

The Ultimate Fighter: Team Jones vs. Team Sonnen middleweight winner Kelvin Gastelum was expected to face former UFC Middleweight Champion Anderson Silva at the event. However, on April 6, 2017, he was pulled from the bout after he was flagged for a potential doping violation by USADA stemming from his most recent bout against Vitor Belfort. Gastelum tested positive for Carboxy-Tetrahydrocannabinol (Carboxy-THC) which is a metabolite of marijuana or hashish above the 180 ng/mL allowance by the World Anti-Doping Agency (WADA) standard. The in-competition sample was collected on the night of Gastelum's fight on March 11 in Brazil. He has been placed on a provisional suspension as a result of the positive drug test and he will be afforded a full adjudication process.

As of April 10, 2017, it was confirmed that former Strikeforce and UFC Middleweight Champion Luke Rockhold was offered the fight and accepted it. In turn, Silva dismissed the idea a day later, citing that Rockhold was coming from a loss and because of that it wouldn't make sense. Instead, Silva floated potential matchups with Uriah Hall or a rematch with semi-retired Nick Diaz. On May 1, Silva gave the UFC an ultimatum: he wants to fight 2000 Olympic silver medalist and former world champion in freestyle wrestling Yoel Romero for the interim title or he will retire. In turn, despite having two months to secure an opponent, Silva and promotion officials confirmed on May 11 that he would not compete at the event.

Felipe Arantes was expected to face Iuri Alcântara at the event. However, on May 11, Arantes was pulled from the fight due to undisclosed reasons and was replaced by promotional newcomer Brian Kelleher.

A lightweight bout between The Ultimate Fighter: Brazil 2 welterweight winner Leonardo Santos and Olivier Aubin-Mercier was scheduled for this event, but was scrapped on May 18 after Aubin-Mercier got injured and Santos decided to pull out of the event.

Results

Bonus awards
The following fighters were awarded $50,000 bonuses:
Fight of the Night: Max Holloway vs. José Aldo
Performance of the Night: Cláudia Gadelha and Brian Kelleher

See also
2017 in UFC
List of UFC events

References

Ultimate Fighting Championship events
2017 in mixed martial arts
Mixed martial arts in Brazil
International sports competitions in Rio de Janeiro (city)
June 2017 sports events in South America